Xavier Decanter, better known as his stage name Tom Snare, is a French DJ and record producer from Dunkirk. Tom Snare rose to fame with a hit single, "Philosophy", with reached #2 in France in early 2006 and is now on the playlist of world famous DJs and bands such as Robbie Rivera, Global Deejays and Hi_Tack. Tom Snare have also released singles under other aliases, such as Blue Star, Pure Star, Master Of Sciences and Undertalk. Tom Snare's first album, Tom Snare's World, was released in October 2006.

Discography

Albums
Tom Snare's World (2006) FR#108
Other City (2009)
TSM (2013)

Singles
 "Waterfalls" (2003)
 "Lick It" (2005)
 "Electro Choc" (2006)
 "Love Sensation" (2006)
 "Running" (2006)
 "Rock on You" (2006)
 "Fashion Avenue" (2006)
 "More Than a Surprise" (2006)
 "Philosophy" (2006) FR#28
 "My Mother Says" (2006)
 "My Homeworld" (2007) FR#20
 "Manureva 2007" (2007) (a.k.a. Art Meson)
 "Apology" (2007)
 "Don't Talk" (2007) (a.k.a. Art Meson)
 "Find The Rhythm" (2007) (alias Tom T or Tom Tonik)
 "Waterfalls 2008" (2008)
 "Breack In" (2008) (a.k.a. Art Meson)
 "Straight Dancing" (2008) (feat. Nicco)
 "Other City" (2009) (feat. Nieggman)
 "I'm Supergirl" (2009) (feat. Nieggman) (alias Art Meson)
 "The Way To Love" (2010)
 "Shout" (2010) (feat. Nieggman)
 "Happy M.I.L.F." (2011)
 " Let You Go " (2015) (Tom Snare & Mico C)

Remixes
 "Hey Girl" - Tribal King
 "Ou Tu Veux" - Arielle Dombasle
 "Nous Deux" - Clara Morgane ft. Shake

External links
  
 Tom Snare discography at Discogs
 Bio on Premiere.fr 
 Tom Snare on Music Story 

French DJs
Musicians from Dunkirk